Robert Wulnikowski (born 11 July 1977) is Polish-German former professional football goalkeeper and now goalkeeping coach.

Career
Born in Bydgoszcz, Wulnikowski began with football in his hometown at the Polish club Zawisza Bydgoszcz. In 1990, he entered the youth division of the FC Schalke 04. In 1997, he was promoted to the second team of the club and played in the Oberliga Westfalen. In 1999, he joined the third division team 1. FC Union Berlin. At Union Berlin, Wulnikowski was initially substitute goalkeeper behind Kay Wehner (Saison 1999–2000) and Sven Beuckert (2000–2002). In 2001, Union was promoted to the 2. Bundesliga without Wulnikowski playing a single league match. In the 2000–01 DFB-Pokal quarter-final against VfL Bochum, Wulnikowski came on after 30 minutes for an injured Beuckert. Union Berlin won that match and succeeded in reaching the final (0–2 against Schalke 04). After the dismissal of longtime coach Georgi Vasilev in October 2002 and the commitment of coach Mirko Votava, Wulnikowski became first-choice goalkeeper For Union Berlin. By the end of the 2003–04 season, after the club was relegated as next to last in the table again, Wulnikowski had completed a total of 54 second-division games for the club.

Wulnikowski moved then to Rot-Weiss Essen for an unknown transfer fee. At the beginning of the season, Wulnikowski was in the starting squad, but made an error in the first match. From matchday three on, coach Jürgen Gelsdorf replaced him with René Renno. At the end of the season, Rot-Weiss Essen was relegated and the contract with the goalkeeper cancelled.

In 2005, Wulnikowski subsequently joined VfR Aalen in the Regionalliga Süd. He completed two seasons as first-choice goalkeeper there. In April 2007, Wulnikowski announce his move to league rivals Sportfreunde Siegen. During the 2007–08 season, he was first-choice goalkeeper for Siegen.

At the beginning of the 2008–09 season, he moved to the third division club Kickers Offenbach. In the 2009–10 winter break, he extended his contract for another three years until the end of the 2012–13 season.

On 27 October 2010, he became nationwide famous for his fantastic match in the 2010–11 DFB-Pokal against Borussia Dortmund, in which he saved two penalties and single-handedly destroyed Dortmund's several other good goal chances. Offenbach won the match 4–2 after Penalty shootout and moved on to round three. He left Offenbach at the end of the 2012–13 season, after they were relegated from the 3. Liga. After six months without a club, he signed for RB Leipzig II for half a season, before joining Würzburger Kickers in July 2014. In June 2017, Wulnikowski ended his professional career and became goalkeeping coach for Würzburger Kickers.

References

External links
 

1977 births
Living people
Sportspeople from Bydgoszcz
Association football goalkeepers
German footballers
Polish footballers
German people of Polish descent
FC Schalke 04 II players
1. FC Union Berlin players
Rot-Weiss Essen players
VfR Aalen players
Sportfreunde Siegen players
Kickers Offenbach players
RB Leipzig II players
Würzburger Kickers players
Zawisza Bydgoszcz players
2. Bundesliga players
3. Liga players